The Alabama–Huntsville Chargers (UAH Chargers) college ice hockey team competed as part of the National Collegiate Athletic Association (NCAA) Division I, representing the University of Alabama in Huntsville (UAH) as a member of the Western Collegiate Hockey Association. UAH has played their home games at Von Braun Center in Huntsville, Alabama since the inception of the program in 1979. The Chargers claim three National Club Championships and two NCAA Division II National Championships in addition to making a pair of appearances in the NCAA Division I men's ice hockey tournament.

Season-by-season results

Note: GP = Games played, W = Wins, L = Losses, T = Ties

 Club records are not included in the totals.
* Winning percentage is used when conference schedules are unbalanced.

Footnotes

References

Alabama-Huntsville
Alabama–Huntsville Chargers ice hockey seasons